Tamworth is an electoral district of the Legislative Assembly in the Australian state of New South Wales. It is represented by the Honourable Kevin Anderson MP of the National Party. In 2019 Anderson was sworn in as the Minister for Better Regulation & Innovation, with additional responsibility for Thoroughbred, Greyhound and Harness Racing codes in New South Wales.

Tamworth covers the entirety of Tamworth Regional Council, Gunnedah Shire, Walcha Shire and a small part of Liverpool Plains Shire around Werris Creek.

History
Tamworth was created in 1880 and it elected two members between 1891 and 1894.  In 1894, with the abolition of multi-member electorates, new electorates were established such as Quirindi, Bingara and Uralla-Walcha, and Tamworth became a single-member electorate.  Proportional representation was introduced in 1920 and Tamworth, along with Gwydir, was absorbed into Namoi.   In 1927 single-member electorates were re-established, including Tamworth.

Members for Tamworth

First incarnation 1880–1920

Second incarnation 1927–present

Election results

References

Tamworth
1880 establishments in Australia
Tamworth
1920 disestablishments in Australia
Tamworth
1927 establishments in Australia
Tamworth
New England (New South Wales)